The Lora prison camp was a prison camp in Split, Croatia. It was active from 1992 to 1997 with mainly Serbian residents of Split and prisoners of war being imprisoned throughout the Croatian War of Independence. The camp was the site of human rights abuses resulting in a controversial trial, acquittal, retrial and conviction of prison guards. Two inmates were killed over the course of its existence.

Background
In 1991, during the Croatian War of Independence, Yugoslav Federal JNA forces were forced to withdraw from Split and the Lora naval compound was occupied by Croatian forces. The naval compound was converted to a prison camp in 1992 to house both civilians and prisoners of war.

Treatment of prisoners
The camp prisoners were subjected to a variety of beating, torture and killings. Guards from the camp were sentenced for murdering and torturing prison inmates. Incidents of prison population being beaten with fists, boots, rubber hoses, batons, baseball bats, plumbing pipes, chains, electrical conductors, tortured by means of forcing of prisoners to eat live snails with the shell, to eat feathers of killed birds, orange peels, live frogs, worms; "Telephoning" – linking of certain parts of body of the prisoner: ears, sexual organs, temples, fingers of hands or toes, to the inducted electric current from the field telephone; 
forcing of prisoners to lick the toilet bowl and WC floor; forcing of prisoners to masturbate; 
hitting of prisoners on the testicles; forcing of prisoners to drink hot, muddy water with the spit of the prison guard; 
placing and tying of a metal barrel on the back of the prisoner and drumming on the barrel; hanging of the prisoner so that his hands are tied with cuff-links and suspended on metal bars of the doors; forcing of prisoners to drink urine; 
forcing of prisoners to have public sexual and in particular homosexual intercourse with each other; 
forcing of prisoner to eat half a kilogram of salt without any water; 
placing in the mouth of a prisoner of a pistol barrel with the threat of firing the pistol;
forcing of prisoners to collect garbage in the prison camp courtyard with their mouths; 
"dancing kolo folk dance" – in the courtyard prisoners would form a circle, holding their hands, and the first one and the last one would be connected with electrodes on to the source of electric current; 
shaving of the prisoner without any water with a knife and forcing the prisoner to eat his own beard; 
forcing of prisoners to tend to grass or cut grass around the prison camp circle in the part which is covered with mines - appeared daily there, and it was one of the most notorious places of organized torture in present-day Croatia.

Aftermath 
In 1998, the Federal Republic of Yugoslavia filed a report to the United Nations regarding the Lora prison camp abuses claiming it was genocide.

The trial 
In 2002, the trial of eight Croatian military officers, members of the 72nd Military Police Battalion, began with charges of the torture and murder of Serbian and Montenegrin prisoners at the camp. All eight were acquitted by Judge Lozina in November 2002 after a trial characterised by intimidation and harassment of witnesses, and alleged threats against the prosecutors.

All eight officers were retried with a verdict handed down by the Split Cantonal Court, War Crimes Chamber on March 2, 2006. The officers were all found guilty of war crimes and sentenced to between 4 and 8 years in prison although four of them were tried in absentia.

References

 Lora War Crimes Trial Ends, HINA, Zagreb, November 20, 2002.

Internment camps in Croatia
20th century in Split, Croatia
History of the Serbs of Croatia
Croatian war crimes in the Croatian War of Independence
Croatian concentration camps in the Yugoslav Wars
Persecution of Serbs